Paul Sydow (1 November 1851 in Kallies – 26 February 1925 in Sophienstädt near Ruhlsdorf) was a German mycologist and lichenologist, father of Hans Sydow (1879–1946).

He worked as a schoolmaster in Berlin. With his son, Hans, he authored works involving descriptions of new species of ascomycetes, rusts and smuts. He also wrote about algae. He authored 252 works in five languages.

Works
 Paul Sydow: Die Flechten Deutschlands : Anleitung zur Kenntnis und Bestimmung der deutschen Flechten, 1887.
 Paul and Hans Sydow: Monographia Uredinearum : seu specierum omnium ad hunc usque diem cognitarum descriptio et adumbratio systematica, 1904–1924.
 Gustav Lindau and Paul Sydow: Thesaurus literaturae mycologicae et lichenologicae. (1908–1917, 5 volumes).
He also made contributions to volume 12 of Pier Andrea Saccardo's Sylloge fungorum omnium hucusque cognitorum, 1897, as well as volume 11 of his Annales Mycologici.

Honours
Several taxa of fungi were named in his honour, including; 
 Sydowia (family Dothioraceae) by Bres. in 1895
 Sydowiellina (family Schizothyriaceae) by Bat. & I.H.Lima in 1959 (named after father and son, Sydow)

See also
 :Category:Taxa named by Paul Sydow

References

External links

 
 Paul Sydow biography

German mycologists
German lichenologists
1851 births
1925 deaths
People from Drawsko County
People from the Province of Pomerania